The White Star is a 1915 British silent drama film directed by Bertram Phillips and starring Queenie Thomas, Norman Howard and Arthur Walcott. It was made the Holmfirth Studios.

Cast
 Queenie Thomas as Iris Ballard  
 Norman Howard as David Marks  
 Rowland Moore as Lord Hawksett  
 Arthur Walcott as Julian Marks  
 W. Willets as Wilson Harley  
 L. Ashwell as Frank Ballard  
 Alf Foy as Stage Door Keeper  
 Syd Baker as Tramp  
 Will Asher as Jack Higgs

References

Bibliography
 Low, Rachael. History of the British Film, 1914-1918. Routledge, 2005.

External links

1915 films
1915 drama films
British drama films
British silent feature films
Films directed by Bertram Phillips
Films set in England
British black-and-white films
1910s English-language films
1910s British films
Silent drama films